Leonardo is a masculine given name.

Leonardo or The Leonardo may also refer to:

Arts and entertainment
 Leonardo Journal, an arts journal
 Leonardo (Italian magazine), a philosophy magazine published in Florence, Italy, in 1903–1907
 Leonardo (Teenage Mutant Ninja Turtles), one of the main characters in the Teenage Mutant Ninja Turtles franchise
 Leonardo (TV channel), an Italian television channel
 Leonardo (2011 TV series), a 2011 CBBC television series which centers around teenage Leonardo da Vinci played by Jonathan Bailey
 Leonardo (2021 TV series), a 2021 Italian-American television series
 Leonardo the Musical: A Portrait of Love, a 1993 musical
 Leonardo/ISAST, the International Society for the Arts, Sciences and Technology
 "The Leonardo", a 1933 short story written in Russian by Vladimir Nabokov

People
 Leonardo da Vinci (1452–1519), Italian polymath
 Leonardo Araújo, Brazilian former footballer and manager, most recently the sporting director of Paris Saint-Germain
 Leonardo (footballer, born 1976), Leonardo dos Santos Silva, Brazilian winger
 Leonardo (footballer, born 1982), Leonardo Gonçalves Silva, Brazilian striker
 Leonardo (footballer, born March 1986), Leonardo José Aparecido Moura, Brazilian centre-back
 Leonardo (footballer, born September 1986), Leonardo Rodrigues Perreira, Brazilian attacking midfielder
 Leonardo (footballer, born 1987), Hugo Leonardo Pereira Nascimento, Brazilian left-back
 Leonardo (footballer, born 1988), José Leonardo Ribeiro da Silva, Brazilian centre-back
 Leonardo (footballer, born 1992), Leonardo da Silva Souza, Brazilian forward

Places
 Leonardo (St. Louis, Missouri), listed on the National Register of Historic Places listings in St. Louis, Missouri, United States
 Leonardo, New Jersey, United States
 The Leonardo (Sandton), Johannesburg, South Africa

Science and technology
 Leonardo (dinosaur), a mummified Brachylophosaurus found in Montana
 Leonardo (moth), a genus of moths of the family Crambidae
 Leonardo (robot), a social robot created by the Personal Robots Group at the Massachusetts Institute of Technology
 Leonardo MPLM, a multi-purpose logistics module used to re-supply the International Space Station
 Leonardo S.p.A., an aerospace and defence technology conglomerate headquartered in Italy
 Leonardo (supercomputer), a petascale supercomputer, currently under construction at the CINECA datacenter in Bologna
 CRV Leonardo, a research vessel of the Centre for Maritime Research and Experimentation
 The Leonardo (Salt Lake City), a science and art museum Salt Lake City, Utah, United States
 Fort Leonardo, Żabbar, Malta

See also
 Leonard (disambiguation)
 Leonardi (disambiguation)
 San Leonardo (disambiguation)